Gaither High School is a public high school located in the Northdale area of Hillsborough County, Florida. It opened in 1984 and is located on 16200 North Dale Mabry Highway. Bloomingdale High School, located in Valrico, Florida, was built around the same time and has the same architectural design.

The school serves the communities of Northdale, Carrollwood Village, Lake Magdalene and other parts of northern Hillsborough County, such as Avila, and parts of southern Lutz.

History and traditions
When Gaither first opened up its doors in 1984–85, Seniors were not in attendance, and the school served only 9th-11th graders (Gaither did not have a class of 1985). In the 1985-86 year, (class of 1989) Gaither kept its doors open to 9th graders.  The following year in 1986–87, Gaither ceased to include 9th graders and began to only house the 10th-12th grades until 1997 when Gaither reinstated a four-year program. Gaither's graduating class of 1988 was the very first group of students that included all four years.

On January 31, 2009, Gaither High School hosted the 7th annual Snoop Bowl, a youth football game which puts a youth team coached by Snoop Dogg up against a youth team coached by an NFL player in conjunction with the Super Bowl which was in Tampa.

The school's most historical rival is Chamberlain High School, however Sickles High School became a prominent rival school for the Cowboys when it opened in 1997
. Contemporarily, the school's most modern and primary rival is Steinbrenner High School, established in 2009. Students from Ben Hill and Buchanan Middle School make up the majority of the population of Gaither students, however there are also many students from Martinez, Adams, and Walker Middle Schools.

Each year, the school hosts a Special Olympics and a Multicultural Assembly. The school's Homecoming is called Starlight.

Arts
Gaither High School offers many courses in performing and fine arts. Such courses include: Band, Chorus, Orchestra, Guitar, Keyboarding, Theatre/Musical Theatre, Technical Theatre/Stagecraft, TV Production, and many other visual arts such as but not limited to Drawing and Ceramics.

Athletics
Gaither offers a variety of seasonal sports for student participation. Sports for both boys and girls include cross country, golf, swimming, volleyball, basketball, soccer, tennis and track.  In addition, boys sports include baseball, wrestling and football while girls compete in softball, flag football and competitive cheer. In certain situations girls may compete on boys teams that do not have a comparable girls team; this typically is found in wrestling, and more rarely in football and baseball.

Demographics
Gaither High School is 44% Hispanic, 37.6% White, 10.4% Black, 3.8% Asian, 3.7% Multi-Racial, 0.3% American Indian and 0.1%Pacific Islander.

Notable alumni
Eddie Ababio, Major League Soccer player
 Adam Bilzerian, winner of the 2009 World Series of Poker
 Dan Bilzerian, internet personality and professional poker player
 Kevin Cash, Major League Baseball catcher and current Tampa Bay Rays manager
 Fernando Gonzalez, North American Soccer League player
 Jennifer Kesse, missing person
 Alex McGough, NFL quarterback for the Seattle Seahawks
 Oscar Mercado, baseball player
 Carlton Mitchell, NFL wide receiver for the Atlanta Falcons
 Brandy Norwood, aka Brandy
 Amani Oruwariye, NFL cornerback for the Detroit Lions
 J.R. Russell, NFL wide receiver
 Brittany Snow, actress
 Jenn Sterger, sports reporter and model
 Kaleb Stewart, musician
 Channing Tatum, actor (transferred to and graduated from Tampa Catholic High School)
 Chad Zerbe, San Francisco Giants relief pitcher

References

External links

 Gaither High website

Educational institutions established in 1984
High schools in Tampa, Florida
Public high schools in Florida
1984 establishments in Florida